Hadım (Eunuch) Suleiman Pasha (1467 – September 1547) was an Ottoman statesman and military commander. He served as the viceroy of Ottoman Egypt in 1525–1535 and 1537–1538, and as Grand Vizier of the Ottoman Empire between 1541 and 1544. He was a Hungarian eunuch, his epithet hadım meaning "eunuch" in Turkish.

The Ottoman Sultan Suleiman the Magnificent ordered Suleiman Pasha as governor of Egypt to conduct a  naval expedition in the Indian Ocean, where he led the capture of Aden and the siege of Diu (in Portuguese India) in 1538. Suleiman Pasha was a benefactor of his long-serving successor in the Egyptian governorship, Davud Pasha (served 1538–1549), whom he championed for the role to spite his rival and colleague, Rüstem Pasha.

See also
 Ottoman naval expeditions in the Indian Ocean
 List of Ottoman Grand Viziers
 List of Ottoman governors of Egypt

References 

Year of birth missing
Place of birth missing
1547 deaths
16th-century Egyptian people
16th-century Hungarian people
16th-century Grand Viziers of the Ottoman Empire
16th-century Ottoman governors of Egypt
Devshirme
Egyptian pashas
Grand Viziers of Suleiman the Magnificent
Ottoman governors of Egypt
Converts to Islam from Christianity
Eunuchs from the Ottoman Empire
Turkish people of Hungarian descent